PEEC could refer to:

 Parramatta Easy English Congregation
 Partial element equivalent circuit